Afghanite, (Na,K)22Ca10[Si24Al24O96](SO4)6Cl6, is a hydrous sodium, calcium, potassium, sulfate, chloride, carbonate alumino-silicate mineral. Afghanite is a feldspathoid of the cancrinite group and typically occurs with sodalite group minerals. It forms blue to colorless, typically massive crystals in the trigonal crystal system. The lowering of the symmetry from typical (for cancrinite group) hexagonal one is due to ordering of Si and Al.  It has a Mohs hardness of 5.5 to 6 and a specific gravity of 2.55 to 2.65. It has refractive index values of nω=1.523 and nε=1.529. It has one direction of perfect cleavage and exhibits conchoidal fracture.  It fluoresces a bright orange.

It was discovered in 1968 in the Lapis-lazuli Mine, Sar-e-Sang, Badakhshan Province, Afghanistan and takes its name from that country. It has also been described from localities in Germany, Italy, the Pamir Mountains of Tajikistan, near Lake Baikal in Siberia, New York and Newfoundland. It occurs as veinlets in lazurite crystals in the Afghan location and in altered limestone xenoliths within pumice in Pitigliano, Tuscany, Italy.

It is used as a gemstone.

See also
 List of gemstones
 List of minerals

References

Sodium minerals
Potassium minerals
Calcium minerals
Aluminium minerals
Feldspathoid
Trigonal minerals
Minerals in space group 159
Gemstones